Fernando Gómez Agudelo (Bogota, April 22, 1931 – November 16, 1993) was a Colombian lawyer who was involved in the development of the television industry in Colombia.

1931 births
1993 deaths
People from Bogotá